Foligno Airport  is an airport serving the Italian city of Foligno in the Umbria region. It is used for general aviation, school, business jet aviation, charter aviation and cargo. It will be used as national base of Civil defense aviation.
Radio assistance available at 119.55 MHz.

References 

Foligno
Airports in Italy
Transport in Umbria
Buildings and structures in Umbria